Xihu Township is a rural township in Miaoli County, Taiwan.

Geography
Xihu is surrounded by Miaoli City on its east, Houlong to the north, Tongxiao to the west, and Tongluo to the south. In January 2023, its population was estimated at 6,416.

Administrative divisions
The township comprises nine villages: Erhu, Gaopu, Hutung, Jinshi, Longdong, Sanhu, Sihu, Wuhu and Xiapu.

Tourist attractions
 Matsu Rock Sculpture
 Wu Chuo-liu Art and Cultural Hall
 Xuanwang Temple

Transportation
Taiwan High Speed Rail passes through the central part of the township, but no station is currently planned.

References

Townships in Miaoli County